The Red Veil is the fifth studio album by SubArachnoid Space, released on February 15, 2005 by Strange Attractors Audio House.

Track listing

Personnel 
Adapted from The Red Veil liner notes.

SubArachnoid Space
 Chris Cones – guitar, electronics
 Diego Gonzalez – bass guitar
 Chris Van Huffel – drums
 Melynda Jackson – guitar

Production and additional personnel
 John Golden – mastering
 Mason Jones – production
 Donny Newenhouse – production
 Joshua Pfeffer – photography, design
 Lorraine Rath – cover art, illustrations
 SubArachnoid Space – production

Release history

References

External links 
 The Red Veil at Discogs (list of releases)

2005 albums
SubArachnoid Space albums